The West Dunbartonshire by-election of 25 April 1950 was held after the death of Labour MP Adam McKinlay on 17 March 1950.

The seat was marginal, having been won in 1950 by only 613 votes, and remained so following the by-election, with Tom Steele holding the seat for Labour by 293 votes.

Result of the previous general election

Result of the by-election

The Glasgow Herald said that while Labour had retained the seat, the party could "take little credit from a victory which was expected to be more pronounced with the aid of the new register and the Loch Sloy vote."

References

1950 in Scotland
1950s elections in Scotland
By-election, 1950
By-election, 1950
1950 elections in the United Kingdom
By-elections to the Parliament of the United Kingdom in Scottish constituencies
20th century in West Dunbartonshire